The Parque Zoológico La Aurora is a zoological park in Guatemala City, Guatemala. It is one of the largest gardens within the city. The zoo has three different areas, where animals from Asia, The Americas and Africa can be appreciated. 
The zoo was founded in 1924 in the southern part of the city, as part of a huge distraction area, then called Parque Reforma, featuring several museums, parks and a hippodrome. Later, with the conversion of a small airfield into La Aurora International Airport the park was intensely diminished. The remains of an ancient viaduct can be found in the park's vicinity. In 2007, the hippodrome was demolished due to a further expansion of the airport.

Notes

External links
 

Guatemala City
Tourist attractions in Guatemala
Parks in Guatemala